National Secondary Route 206, or just Route 206 (or ) is a National Road Route of Costa Rica, located in the San José, Cartago provinces.

Description
In San José province the route covers Desamparados canton (Desamparados, San Miguel districts).

In Cartago province the route covers Cartago canton (Quebradilla district).

References

Highways in Costa Rica